Rubio (Spanish for blond) may refer to:

People
Rubio (surname)
Rubio (footballer, born 1976), Spanish football manager and former defender
Rubio (footballer, born 1981), Spanish football midfielder
Rubio (footballer, born 1995), Spanish football forward

Places
 Rubio, Iowa, American unincorporated community
 Rubio, Venezuela, Venezuelan town
 El Rubio, Seville, Spain, Spanish town

Other uses
 Rubio (horse), a racehorse

See also